Rachel Caine was the pen name of Roxanne Longstreet Conrad (April 27, 1962 – November 1, 2020) who was an American writer of science fiction, fantasy, mystery, suspense, and horror novels.

Personal life
Conrad grew up in West Texas and graduated from Socorro High School in El Paso, Texas, in 1980. She earned a bachelor's degree in accounting from the Rawls College of Business at Texas Tech University in 1985, with minor in music. Caine wrote and published novels and short stories since 1990. She was a professional musician who played with notable musicians including Henry Mancini, Peter Nero, and John Williams.

From 1999, Conrad was employed in corporate communications as a web designer, editor, corporate communications manager, and finally as director of corporate communications for a large multinational company. She took an eight-month hiatus for most of 2008 to meet pressing deadlines, and retired from her position to write full-time in 2010. She lived in north Texas with her husband, artist Cat Conrad. Conrad did most of her writing at home and on the road during appearances.

In 2018, Conrad was diagnosed with soft tissue sarcoma. She died on November 1, 2020.

Bibliography 
Sources:

As Rachel Caine

Standalone novels

Weather Warden (Adult Urban Fantasy)
Joanne Baldwin is a Weather Warden and part of an organization that rents space from the UN.  Their mission is supposed to be alleviating natural disasters before millions of people die.  Joanne shows up on the run, in her hot Mustang "Delilah", from a murder of which she has been accused; she thinks if she can find Lewis Orwell, with all three Warden capabilities—Earth, Fire, and Weather—who is in hiding, she can get help.  Lewis' last known action among the Wardens was to steal three bottles containing Djinn, the supernatural beings, many of whom partner with Wardens to do their work.  Her life becomes one huge complication as she learns a lot of truths people do not want her to know.

Red Letter Days (Adult Urban Fantasy)

The Morganville Vampires (Young Adult)

Athena Force (Adult Urban Fantasy)

The Outcast Season (Adult Urban Fantasy) 
On August 24, 2007, Caine announced on her mailing list and her blog that she had sold a four-book series called "Outcast Season" to Roc Books. Describing the upcoming series, she said "This series is a spin-off of the Weather Warden series, and will follow the story of a Djinn who's been cut off from her fellows, and must rely on the goodwill of a Warden partner for her very existence. Along the way, she has to face enemies and challenges that the Djinn can't, or won't face themselves." The series was published yearly in February since 2009.

The Revivalist (Adult Urban Fantasy)

The Great Library (Young Adult)

Stillhouse Lake
In 2017, Caine began publication of an intense new thriller series about Gwen Proctor, the ex-wife of an infamous serial killer who is constantly on guard for her kids against Internet trolls and real-life stalkers. When a body turns up in the lake outside their front door, and it appears to be connected to her ex-husband's methods, the spotlight's now on Gwen and her kids ... and she might never escape it again. 'Stillhouse Lake' is one of five finalists for the IATWA Thriller Awards 2018.

The Honors
Co-authored by Ann Aguirre.

Short stories

As Roxanne Longstreet

As Roxanne Conrad

Stargate SG-1

As Ian Hammel

As Julie Fortune

Anthologies and collections

References

Interview by Lola Sparks at Purple Pens
Interview with Michael A. Ventrella, April 4, 2010.

External links

1962 births
2020 deaths
20th-century American novelists
21st-century American novelists
20th-century American women writers
21st-century American women writers
American fantasy writers
American science fiction writers
Writers from El Paso, Texas
Texas Tech University alumni
Rawls College of Business alumni
Urban fantasy writers
Novelists from Texas
American writers of young adult literature
American mystery writers
Women science fiction and fantasy writers
Women mystery writers
American women novelists
Women writers of young adult literature
American romantic fiction writers
Deaths from cancer in the United States
Deaths from soft-tissue sarcoma
Pseudonymous women writers
20th-century pseudonymous writers
21st-century pseudonymous writers